The Y class is a class of diesel locomotives built by the Tasmanian Government Railways between 1961 and 1971.

History
The Y class were designed by English Electric and constructed by the Tasmanian Government Railways' Inveresk Workshops. Eight were built as mainline freight and passenger locomotives between 1961 and 1971.

Following the success of the X class, the Tasmanian Government Railways decided to order additional diesel locomotives.

English Electric submitted plans that were quite similar to the Jamaican Railways 81 class, South Australian Railways 800 class and Midland Railways of Western Australia F class but with a small power increase. They were slightly larger and more powerful than the X class. They had a similar layout to the X class, a long hood unit with the cab at one end.

Construction began at the TGR's Inveresk Workshops in 1961, and three of the planned eight were completed relatively quickly. However, construction of the other five was slow, with the last not being delivered until 1971, by which time the design had become dated.

Technical details
The Y class were fitted with an English Electric 6SRKT Mark II (Mark III on last two) in-line six turbocharged diesel engine. They have a Bo-Bo wheel arrangement and end-platforms, making them visually different from the X class.

In line with standard TGR practice of the time, they were fitted with hook-and-link couplers and vacuum train brakes (air on locomotive). They were noted to have a tendency to wheel-slip badly. Nevertheless, they were considered successful.

Later years
In March 1978, the Y class were included in the transfer of the Tasmanian Government Railways to Australian National. With the new transfer of twenty 830 class locomotives from South Australia and later purchase of ZB class and ZC class locomotives from Queensland Rail, the Y class were made redundant.

In the late 1970s and early 1980s, all members of the Y class were retrofitted with stronger automatic couplers, which had by then become standard equipment. Y1 & Y5 also received air train brakes in 1985, with the others withdrawn following the cessation of vacuum braked services in 1988. Most of these where been preserved at this stage. With Y2 going to Derwent Valley Railway, Y3 going to Queen Victoria Museum & Art gallery, Launceston, Y4 to Tasmanian Transport Museum and finally Y6&8 to Don River Railway. With Tasrail retaining Y7 for parts.

Y7 was rebuilt in 2001 as a driving van for use on Railton to Devonport cement trains. With this finally stored in 2017. Two members of the class remained in regular service with TasRail, renumbered as the 2150 class, until mid 2016 when stored out of use.

In May 2022, Y1 (2150) & Y5 (2151) where donated for preservation to Derwent Valley Railway and Launceston & North East Railway respectively. Only leaving DV1, formally Y7, not preserved.

Status table

See also 
 Former Tasmanian Government Railways locomotives
 Locomotives of the Tasmanian Government Railways/1950

References

Bo-Bo locomotives
English Electric locomotives
Diesel locomotives of Tasmania
Railway locomotives introduced in 1961
Diesel-electric locomotives of Australia